Philippe Fénelon (born 23 November 1952, Suèvres, Loir-et-Cher) is a French classical composer.

Works, editions and recordings
Opera
 1984 : Le Chevalier imaginaire, in prologue and 2 acts after Cervantès and Kafka. Théâtre du Châtelet.
 1992 : Salammbô, in 3 acts after Flaubert. Opéra de Paris, premiere conducted by Gary Bertini
 1998 : Les Rois, in 3 acts after Cortázar. Grand Théâtre de Bordeaux.
 2005 : Faust, 2 acts after Nikolaus Lenau. Théâtre du Capitole de Toulouse.
 2010 : La Cerisaie, 2 scenes and epilogue after Chekhov. Premiere at the Bolshoi 2010 (in concert).
 2012 : JJR, Citoyen de Genève, on Jean-Jacques Rousseau

Ballet
 Yamm (2000); choreography by Lionel Hoche; produced at l'Opéra de Paris

Chamber music
 Caprice for viola solo (1977, revised 1982)
 Nit for viola solo (1994)
 Epha for bassoon and viola (2000)
 Fragment II for basset horn and viola (2002)

References

1952 births
Living people
French classical composers
French male classical composers